Daniel Mark Housego (born 12 October 1988) is an English cricketer who last played county cricket for Gloucestershire and is a right-handed top order batsman.

Dan Housego was educated; first at Moulsford Prep School, Oxford, then at The Oratory School, Woodcote. He attended the Middlesex Cricket Academy. He made his first-class debut versus Derbyshire in August 2008, aged nineteen.

He played youth team football for Oxford United and won the Under-12 national 200m championship. He has also played for Berkshire in the Minor Counties Championship on numerous occasions.

He represented Middlesex in 15 first-class matches (2008–2011) and 5 Twenty20 matches (2008–2009). He left the staff after the end of the 2011 season.

On 25 January 2012, Housego joined Gloucestershire on a three-year deal, taking him to the end of the 2014 season. Housego had previously been at Gloucestershire as part of their youth academy.

References

External links
 
 Gloucestershire County Cricket Club Interview

1988 births
Living people
Sportspeople from Windsor, Berkshire
English cricketers
Berkshire cricketers
Gloucestershire cricketers
Middlesex cricketers